The Great Indian Murder is a Hindi-language crime mystery drama streaming television series directed by Tigmanshu Dhulia for Disney+ Hotstar. It is produced by Ajay Devgn and Priti Sinha  under ADF & RLE Media.  The series stars are Richa Chadha, Pratik Gandhi, Ashutosh Rana , Raghuvir Yadav , Sharib Hashmi , Paoli Dam and Shashank Arora in key roles. The series is based on Vikas Swarup's bestselling novel Six Suspects. The season was made available for streaming on OTT platform Disney+ Hotstar on 4 February 2022. in Hindi, Marathi, Tamil, Telugu, Kannada, Malayalam and Bengali languages.

Cast 
 Richa Chadha as DCP Sudha Bharadwaj
 Pratik Gandhi as CBI officer Suraj Yadav
 Ashutosh Rana as Jagganath Rai, Vicky's father
 Jatin Goswami as Vicky Rai, Jagganath's son
 Raghubir Yadav as Mohan Kumar
 Sharib Hashmi as Ashok Rajput & Amar Rajput (Dual-appearance)
 Sakshi Benipuri as Ishwari
 Paoli Dam as Shabnam Saxena
 Shashank Arora as Munna
 Amey Wagh as Arun Deshmukh
 Mani PR as Eketi
 Vineet Kumar as Ambika Prasad
 Kenneth Desai as CM Shashikant Vohra
 Rucha Inamdar as Ritu Rai, Vicky's sister
 Liam Macdonald as Larry Page
 Himanshi Choudhry as Rita Sethi
 Guneet Singh as Manjot
 Deepraj Rana as Prithvi
 Vivek Mishra as Guru Atmadev
 Hemant Mahaur as Billu Biriyani 
 Kali Prasad Mukherjee as Debu Da
 Shakti Mohan as Special appearance in song "Raskala"
 Raftaar as Special appearance in song "Raskala"
 [Samarth Chaudhary]

Review 
Tigmanshu Dhulia's stories often run with an undercurrent of characters commenting on contemporary politics. "The Great Indian Murder" is woven around a high-profile murder based on Vikas Swarup's breakthrough novel "Six Suspects." The presence of several political events can be felt in "The Great Indian Murder." It is a complex story with many social undertones. Examples include allegations of espionage of politicians, misuse of CBI for political gain and loss, crooked sons of politicians intoxicated by power, politicians conspiring to any extent to fulfill their political ambitions, fake religious leaders, Naxalism, etc. The story is pieced together through a CBI investigation into the murder of Vicky Rai. A series steeped in suspense, it has been praised by most critics. Every character is written well, which keeps the audience engaged with the story. Tigmanshu Dhulia's direction and the actors' performances have received critical praise.

Marketing and release

Promotion 
The official trailer of seasons of this series was launched on 18 January 2022.

Release 
The season was made available for streaming on OTT platform Disney+ Hotstar on 4 February 2022.

Episodes

Series overview

Season  (2022)

Soundtrack
The soundtrack's music composers are Raghu Dixit, Darshan Doshi, Umang Doshi and Ketan Sodha.

References

External links 
 
 The Great Indian Murder on Rotten Tomatoes
 The Great Indian Murder on Disney+ Hotstar

2022 web series debuts
Indian drama web series
Hindi-language television shows
Television shows based on Indian novels
Indian web series
Hindi-language web series
Indian crime television series
Indian mystery television series
Web series based on novels
2022 Indian television series debuts
Crime thriller web series
Crime drama web series
Psychological thriller web series
Indian political television series
Political satirical television series
Hindi-language Disney+ Hotstar original programming
Television series about organized crime